James Robert Bilsbury (2 November 1942 – 10 March 2003) was an English pop singer and songwriter, most famous for co-writing the Boney M hit, "Belfast", and as a member of the Magic Lanterns and the Les Humphries Singers. He was born in Liverpool.

After appearing with the Ray Johnson Skiffle Group, the Nightboppers, the Beat Boys, the Sabres and the Hammers, and singing and writing for the Magic Lanterns, Bilsbury co-founded the Les Humphries Singers in 1970 with Les Humphries, and was a member when they represented Germany in the 1976 Eurovision Song Contest with "Sing Sang Song". Bilsbury also performed with Megaton. He co-wrote "Belfast" for popular disco formation Boney M. with singer Drafi Deutscher and Joe Menke.

Bilsbury, who according to Neue Revue had been living on social welfare, was found dead in his  apartment in Bonn on 13 March 2003, and the post mortem established that he had died three days earlier from heart failure. He was cremated and his ashes were buried in Gauting Waldfriedhof near Munich, at a ceremony attended by his 16-year-old son.

References

1942 births
2003 deaths
Singers from Liverpool
Les Humphries Singers members
English pop singers
English songwriters
20th-century English singers